This list of Texas A&M University people includes notable alumni, faculty, and affiliates of Texas A&M University. The term Texas Aggie, which comes from Texas A&M's history as an agricultural school, refers to students and alumni of Texas A&M. The class year of each alumnus indicates the projected undergraduate degree award year designation, although the actual year may differ. At Texas A&M and within its student culture, the term "former student" is more commonly used than "alumni".

Former students

Armed forces

Arts

Art and architecture

Film, television, and theater

Journalism and literature

Music

Pageantry

Business

College presidents

Criminal activity

Government and politics

Heads of state

U.S. cabinet secretaries

U.S. federal judges

U.S. state governors

U.S. House of Representatives members

U.S. ambassadors and foreign political figures

State Upper House members

State Lower House members

Metropolitan mayors

NASA

National political figures

State political figures

Science and technology

Faculty and affiliates

Nobel Prize laureates

Academia

College presidents

Professors and scholars

Armed forces

Government and politics

Heads of state

U.S. cabinet secretaries

U.S. state governors

U.S. senators

U.S. ambassadors and foreign political figures

National political figures

State political figures

Journalism and literature 
Joe Feagin – Pulitzer Prize nominee
Charles Gordone – 1970 Pulitzer Prize recipient
Robert Sherrill – journalist

Science and technology 
 Perry L. Adkisson – Wolf Prize winner; World Food Prize winner
 George Bass – National Medal of Science winner
 Richard H. Battin – applied mathematician and engineer
 Fuller W. Bazer – Wolf Prize winner
 Robert Byron Bird – 1987 National Medal of Science winner
 F. Albert Cotton – National Medal of Science Laureate in Chemistry; Wolf Prize winner; Priestly Medal winner
 Michael E. DeBakey – world-renowned cardiac surgeon, innovator, and scientist
 Paul Erdős – mathematician
 Leonid Keldysh – namesake of Keldysh formalism
 John Henry Kinealy – engineer and inventor
 Peter Lax – mathematician
 Gordon Manley – climatologist
 Leonard M. Pike – established the Vegetable Improvement Center
 Marlan Scully – physicist
 Hobart Muir Smith – herpetologist; credited with describing more than 100 new species of American reptiles and amphibians
 Bjarne Stroustrup – designer and original implementer of the C++ programming language
 Nicholas B. Suntzeff – cosmologist, winner of Gruber Prize in cosmology, co-discoverer of dark energy
 Fred Weick – aviation pioneer
 James Womack – Wolf Prize winner

Sports

 Bob Griffin (born 1950), American-Israeli basketball player, and English Literature professor
 Mauro Hamza, fencing coach

Athletes

Baseball 

James Henry Thomas (future) – Texas Rangers starting center fielder
Kevin Beirne (1996) – former MLB player
Matt Blank (1997) – MLB player
Rip Collins – former MLB player
Lew Ford – MLB player
Casey Fossum (2000) – MLB player
Jeff Granger – former MLB player
Grady Higginbotham (1920) – Texas A&M baseball head coach (1930–1935); Texas Tech Red Raiders baseball head coach (1928–1929); Texas Tech Red Raider football head coach (1929); Texas Tech Red Raiders basketball head coach (1925–1927)
Zach Jackson (2005) – MLB player
Davey Johnson (1968) – former MLB player and team manager, 1973 Comeback Player of the Year, three-time Gold Glove winner, four-time all-star, three-time World Series champion, 1997 AL Manager of the Year, 2012 NL Manager of the Year
Logan Kensing (2005) – MLB player
Chuck Knoblauch (1990) – 1991 MLB rookie of the year, four-time all-star, four-time MLB World Series champion
Wally Moon (1951) – 1954 MLB rookie of the year, 1960 Gold Glove winner, two-time all-star, two-time MLB World Series champion
Trey Moore – former MLB player
Jake Mooty – former MLB player
Troy Neel – former MLB player
C. E. "Pat" Olsen (1923) – former professional baseball player; namesake of Olsen Field
Les Peden – former MLB player
Cliff Pennington - former MLB player
Cotton Pippen – former MLB player
Eric Reed (2003) – MLB player
Topper Rigney – former MLB player
Justin Ruggiano (2004) – 2007 Baseball World Cup player; former MLB player
Ryan Rupe (1998) – former MLB player
Ross Stripling – MLB pitcher for the Toronto Blue Jays
 Russ Swan (1986) – former MLB player
 Mark Thurmond (1979) – former MLB player
 Jason Tyner (1999) – former MLB player
 Michael Wacha – MLB pitcher for the Tampa Bay Rays
 Kevin Whelan – MLB player
 Kelly Wunsch (1994) – former MLB player

Basketball 

Morenike Atunrase (2008) – WNBA player
John Beasley (1966) – former ABA player
David Britton (1979) – former NBA player
 R. C. Buford (1980) – general manager of the San Antonio Spurs
Alex Caruso (2016) NBA player for the Los Angeles Lakers
Winston Crite (1987) – former NBA player
Walt Davis (1952) – former NBA player
A'Quonesia Franklin (2008) – WNBA player
Jalen Jones (born 1993) - player for Hapoel Haifa in the Israeli Basketball Premier League
DeAndre Jordan (2008) – center for Brooklyn Nets
Antanas Kavaliauskas (2007) – Panionios BC player; NBA summer league player
Acie Law IV (2007) – NBA player
Doug Lee (1984) – former NBA player
Darryl McDonald (1988) – NBL player
Khris Middleton – NBA player for the Milwaukee Bucks
Josh Nebo (born 1997) - player in the Israeli Basketball Premier League
Sonny Parker (1976) – former NBA player
Jaynetta Saunders (2001) – former WNBA player
 Elijah Thomas (born 1996) - player in the Israeli Basketball Premier League
Brooks Thompson (1986) – former NBA player; head coach of University of Texas – San Antonio basketball team
Toccara Williams (2004) – former WNBA player
Antoine Wright (2006) – NBA player

American football 

Sam Adams (1993) – NFL player
Dennis Allen – NFL coach
Keith Baldwin – former NFL player
Ken Beck – former NFL player
Phil Bennett (1978) – former SMU Mustangs football coach
Martellus Bennett (2009) – NFL player
Michael Bennett (2009) – NFL player
Rocky Bernard (2002) – NFL player
Rod Bernstine (1987) – former NFL player
Reggie Brown (1999) – former NFL player
 Harvey "Bum" Bright (1943) – former owner of the Dallas Cowboys
Domingo Bryant – NFL player
Melvin Bullitt (2007) – NFL player
Lee Roy Caffey (1963) – former NFL player
Dan Campbell (1999) – NFL coach and former player
Red Cashion (1953) – football official
Ray Childress (1985) – former NFL player
Mike Clark (1962) – former NFL player
Chris Cole (1998) – former NFL player
Calvin Collins (1995) – former NFL player
Albert Connell (1996) – former NFL player
Bobby Joe Conrad (1958) – former NFL player
Quentin Coryatt (1994) – former NFL player
John David Crow (1958) – former NFL player and Heisman Trophy winner in 1957
Matt Darwin (1985) – former NFL player
Sammy Davis (2003) – NFL player
Curtis Dickey (1980) – former NFL player
Ron Edwards (2001) – NFL player
Dave Elmendorf (1971) – former NFL player
Eric England (1993) – former NFL player
Mike Evans (2014) – NFL player
Robert Ferguson (2001) – NFL player
Ronald Flemons (2001) – CFL player
Jerry Fontenot (1998) – NFL assistant coach; former NFL player
Tony Franklin (1979) – former NFL player
E. King Gill – Inspiration for the moniker "12th Man"
Aaron Glenn|(1993) – NFL player
Jason Glenn (2000) – former NFL player
Dante Hall (1998) – NFL player
Curley Hallman (1969) – former football coach
Geoff Hangartner (2004) – NFL player
Lester Hayes (1976) – former NFL player
Greg Hill (1993) – former NFL player
Warrick Holdman (1998) – NFL player
Johnny Holland (1986) – NFL coach; former NFL player
Robert Jackson (1976) – former NFL player
Tramain Jacobs – NFL player
Michael Jameson (2000) – former NFL player
Edward Jasper – former NFL player
Bethel Johnson (2002) – NFL player
Johnny Jolly (2006) – NFL player
Keith Joseph (2004) – former NFL player
Drew Kaser – NFL player
Terrence Kiel (2002) – former NFL player
Kelvin Korver – former NFL player
Gary Kubiak (1982) – Houston Texans head coach; former NFL player
Yale Lary (1952) – former NFL player
Shane Lechler (1999) – NFL player
Johnny Manziel (2014) – NFL player
Jason Mathews (2003) – former NFL player
Leeland McElroy (1997) – former NFL player
Seth McKinney (2000) – NFL player
Steve McKinney (1997) – NFL player
Reggie McNeal (2006) – former NFL player
Ray Mickens (1996) – former NFL player
Von Miller (2011) – NFL player for the Denver Broncos
Brandon Mitchell (1996) – former NFL player
Mike Montgomery – NFL player
Mark Moseley – former NFL player
Don Muhlbach (2003) – NFL player
Terrence Murphy (2005) – former NFL player and coach
Robert Neyland – former University of Tennessee head coach
Dat Nguyen (1998) – assistant coach for the Dallas Cowboys; former NFL player; Lombardi Award and Bednarik Award winner
Ernie Pannell – former NFL player
Jack Pardee (1957) – former NFL player and coach
Alan Reuber (2003) – former NFL player
Gary Reynolds – NFL assistant coach
Tommy Robison – former NFL player
Zerick Rollins – NFL assistant coach
Thomas Sanders – former NFL player, Chicago Bears, Philadelphia Eagles
Ed Simonini (1976) – former NFL player
Shawn Slocum (1984) – NFL coach
Detron Smith (1995) – former NFL player
Kevin Smith (1992) – former NFL player
Cameron Spikes (1998) – former NFL player
Gene Stallings (1957) – former NFL player and coach
George Strohmeyer – AAFC player
Boone Stutz (2005) – NFL player
Dennis Swilley (1976) – former NFL player
Damon Tassos – former NFL player
Chris Taylor (2001) – former NFL player
Jamaar Taylor (2004) – former NFL player
Garth TenNapel (1976) – former NFL player
Pat Thomas (1976) – former NFL player
Rodney Thomas (1995) – former NFL player
Rex Tucker (1998) – former NFL player
Joe Utay (1908) – College Football Hall of Famer
Kary Vincent – former Arena Football League player
Ty Warren (2003) – NFL player
Richmond Webb (1990) – former NFL player
Jason Webster (1998) – NFL player
Taylor Whitley (2002) – former NFL player
Mike Whitwell (1981) – former NFL player
Pat Williams (1996) – NFL player
Billy Yates (2002) – NFL player
James Zachery – CFL player
Derel Walker (2014) – CFL player – 2015 Most Outstanding Rookie

Golf 
Danny Briggs (1983) – golfer
Bronson Burgoon – PGA Tour golfer; Texas A&M Golf National Champion
Cameron Champ – golfer
Jeff Maggert (1986) – golfer
Bobby Nichols – twelve-time winner on the PGA Tour; winner of the 1964 PGA Championship and runner up at the 1967 Masters
Ryan Palmer – golfer
Philip Parkin – winner of British Amateur Championship (1983); Sir Henry Cotton Rookie of the Year (1984)

Olympics

Tennis 
 Grant Connell (1986) – former world No. 1 doubles player
 Dean Goldfine (1987) – former Team USA coach and former coach to Andy Roddick

Other 
 Shaine Casas – swimmer; 2021 World Short Course 100 m backstroke champion
 Jacobs Crawley – rodeo world champion
 Kristy Hawkins – professional female bodybuilder
 Eddie Hill – drag racer
 Anjanette Kirkland – hurdler; 2001 World Indoor 60 m hurdles champion; 2001 World 100 m champion
 Fabrice Lapierre – long jumper; 2005 NCAA long jump national champion
 Paige Miller – swimmer; four-time conference champion; 2014 NCAA champion, 100 backstroke
 Dude Perfect – a multinational sports & entertainment conglomerate

Fictional 
 PC Principal – Character on the television show South Park, principal at South Park Elementary, reveals he’s a Texas A&M alumni in the season 19 episode Stunning and Brave.
 Thermite -  Operator from the video game “Rainbow Six: Siege”. In-game biography states he graduated from Texas A&M with a Bachelor’s of Science in Chemistry.

References

External links 
 Texas A&M University
 The Association of Former Texas A&M Students

Texas AundM University people